The South Korean ambassador to the United States is the chief diplomatic representative of the Republic of Korea accredited to the United States.

After the independence of Korea from Japanese rule in 1945, and the founding of Republic of Korea (South Korea) in 1948, South Korea immediately restored normal diplomatic relationship with the United States and has since been sending ambassadors to the United States. Although Chang Myon is officially recorded as the first ambassador serving from February 1949, Chough Pyung-ok was recognized in August 1948 as the Special Representative of the President of South Korea with a personal rank of Ambassador. Chang replaced Chough in January 1949 in the same capacity, and was appointed as the first ambassador the following month.

South Korea has so far sent twenty-four ambassadors to the United States, excluding 2 Chargé d'affaires a.i. (Koo Chong-whay and Oh Jay-hee). As Chung Il-kwon served twice as the third and fifth ambassador, a total of twenty-three different people have served in the position.

Reflecting the United States' significance to South Korea's diplomacy, almost all of these ambassadors have been chosen from elites in their respective fields. For instance, the four most recent ambassadors have all been either career diplomats who had served in the high levels of the Ministry of Foreign Affairs (e.g., Ahn Ho-young, Choi Young-jin, and Lee Tae-sik), or in high government positions such as Prime Minister and head of the Finance Ministry (e.g., Han Duck-soo) before being appointed to Washington, D.C.

A complete list of ambassadors is provided below in the order of appointment. All held the title of Ambassador Extraordinary and Plenipotentiary while in office.

Ambassadors

References

See also
Embassy of South Korea, Washington, D.C.
Ambassador of the United States to South Korea
Ambassadors of the United States
Foreign relations of South Korea
South Korea–United States relations

United States
Korea South